The Ministry of Investment (Indonesian: Kementerian Investasi) is a government ministry formed by the Indonesian government in 2021. The ministry responsible for investment affairs and facilitating easiness of investment in Indonesia.

History 
On 30 March 2021, Joko Widodo submitted a Presidential Letter No. R-14/Pres/03/2021 to People's Representative Council contained a proposal for major change his cabinet. In his Presidential Letter, Ministry of Investment, will be spin off from existing Coordinating Ministry for Maritime and Investments Affairs to be independent ministry on its own, but still under its coordination.

On 9 April 2021, People's Representative Council, approved the changes. 

The form of the ministry is not yet known at that time of announcement of approval. It was speculated that the new ministry either split off from part of Coordinating Ministry for Maritime and Investments Affairs or elevation of existing Investment Coordinating Board. However, it later confirmed that the ministry actually elevation of Investment Coordinating Board. If done, this ministry is continuation of previously Suharto era and early Reformasi era's Habibie State Ministry of the Promotion of Investment, which existed during 1993 to 1999, during Sixth Development Cabinet and Development Reform Cabinet, respectively.

On 13 April 2021, Ali Mochtar Ngabalin, spokesperson and expert professional of Deputy IV (Information and Political Communication) Presidential Staff Office, announced that the second reshuffle will take place on second week of April 2021. However, due to many reasons, the second reshuffle finally announced at 28 April 2021. Unusual for reshuffle happened in Indonesia, this reshuffle was the first of its kind which not only reshuffled the ministers, but also disbanding ministry institutions during the mid-term. In this reshuffle, Bahlil Lahadalia appointed as the first holder of Minister of Investment. All appointed officials inaugurated and their respective new offices were established with Presidential Decision No. 72/P/2021.

Organizations 

By the virtue of the ministry temporary constitutional document, Presidential Decree No. 31/2021, the ministry headed by Minister of Investment. The minister post is a concurrent post in which the minister also acted as Head of Indonesia Investment Coordinating Board. As the ministry is elevation of the previous Indonesian Investment Coordinating Board, the ministry was retained the previous organizational structure of the board (Presidential Decree No. 24/2020). However, the result is the ministry structure was mixed, and overlapped. On 29 July 2021, the structure of the ministry and the board amended with the issuance of Presidential Decree No. 63/2021 (Ministry of Investment) and No. 64/2021 (Indonesia Investment Coordinating Board). With the amendment, the structure and responsibilities between the ministry and the board are clearly separated, not mixed as before.

The ministry, as the Presidential Decree No. 63/2021 outlined, is the planning, regulating, and decision making of the investment policies in Indonesia. The ministry is organized in following manner:

 Office of the Ministry of Investment (concurrent post with Chief of Indonesia Investment Coordinating Board).
 Office of the Deputy Ministry of Investment (concurrent post with Vice Chief of Indonesia Investment Coordinating Board).
 Office of the Ministry Secretariat
 Advisors to the Ministry:
 Enhancement of Investment Competitiveness
 Macroeconomy
 Institutional Relation
 Development of Investment Sector Priorities
 Equity and Partnerships in Capital Investment

List of ministers

See also 
 Cabinet of Indonesia
 Investment Coordinating Board

References 

Investment
Indonesia
Central Jakarta
Government agencies established in 2021
2021 establishments in Indonesia